Boyer Chute National Wildlife Refuge, created in 1992, is a National Wildlife Refuge (NWR) located along the banks of the Missouri River in the U.S. state of Nebraska. The  refuge preserves an area that had been cultivated and neglected before the early 1990s. Channelization projects along the Missouri River to improve flood control and navigation resulted in the closing off a side branch of the river, known since the early 19th century as Boyer Chute. Between 1820 and 1937 the Missouri River had migrated  eastward and the area of the chute had originally been on the east bank of the river; today, the chute is west of the main channel of the Missouri. In 1937, the Army Corps of Engineers began to rechannel portions of the Missouri River, cutting off the chute to flowing water. Overgrowth and cultivation took over the lands now preserved in the refuge. Restoration of the area commenced in 1993; this included planting 9,100 native plants and trees and restoring the inflow to the chute from the main channel of the Missouri River.

Today, the refuge is home to dozens of mammal species, including white-tailed deer, beavers, opossum, raccoon, bobcat, fox and coyote. Bald eagle, heron, duck, belted kingfisher and hawks are known to inhabit the refuge.  Restoration projects also improved sport fishing opportunities by providing better breeding habitat. The refuge is along one of the primary bird migration routes in North America; the population of migratory birds increases substantially during spring and fall months.

Several miles of nature trails provide access through portions of the refuge and a concrete pedestrian bridge crosses over the chute to an island. During low water flow levels along the Missouri River in the late fall and winter months, the chute may have little or no water in it. Hunting is allowed in season with a permit and there are several fishing piers. No pets are allowed in the refuge.

The refuge sustained extensive damage during the 2011 Missouri River floods. As of spring 2012, the refuge roads remained closed and no date had been determined for when they would be reopened. 300,000 dollars has been requested to remove six flood damaged structures in an effort to get the refuge reopened. Planners indicated that structures may not be rebuilt since there is no method to protect them from future flooding events.

See also
 DeSoto National Wildlife Refuge
 Fort Atkinson State Historic Park

References

External links
 Boyer Chute National Wildlife Refuge

National Wildlife Refuges in Nebraska
Missouri River
Protected areas of Washington County, Nebraska
Protected areas established in 1992
1992 establishments in the United States